Ayrton De Pauw (born 12 March 1998) is a Belgian male track cyclist, representing Belgium at international competitions. He competed at the 2016 UEC European Track Championships in the team sprint event and 1 km time trial event.

References

1998 births
Living people
Belgian male cyclists
Belgian track cyclists
Place of birth missing (living people)